Leanne Elizabeth Donaldson is an Australian politician. She was the Labor member for Bundaberg in the Queensland Legislative Assembly from 2015 to 2017.

On 8 December 2015, Donaldson was sworn in as the Minister for Agriculture and Fisheries in the second Palaszczuk Cabinet, becoming the first woman to serve in this role. She resigned from Cabinet in November 2016 after controversies involving unpaid bills and unregistered driving.

She lost her seat to LNP candidate David Batt at the 2017 election.

References

Year of birth missing (living people)
Living people
Members of the Queensland Legislative Assembly
Australian Labor Party members of the Parliament of Queensland
21st-century Australian politicians
Women members of the Queensland Legislative Assembly
21st-century Australian women politicians